Shri Krushna Chandra Gajapati Autonomous College is an autonomous college situated in Paralakhemundi, on the south geographical part of Odisha.

History
The history of growth and development of the college is an account of the ardent zeal and dedicated endeavour of the former rulers of Paralakhemundi for the spread of education in Odisha. This illustrious institution was founded in 1896 under the munificent patronage of the Raja of Paralakhemundi "Shri Shri Shri Goura Chandra Gajapati Narayana Deo". In the same year it obtained affiliation as a second grade college from the Madras University. Due to the initiative and continued efforts by our foster father, Maharaja Sri Krushna Chandra Gajapati Narayana Deo the college was upgraded to the status of a first grade college in 1936.

Originally affiliated to the Madras University and then to the Andhra University. The college had the honour of being one of the first five affiliated colleges with which Utkal University started functioning in November 1943. On 2 January 1967 Berhampur University came into existence and since then the college is affiliated to it.

On 11 July 1947 the management was taken over by the Government of Orissa and the college was named after its foster father and patron Sri Krushna Chandra Gajapati. Towards the end of 1948, the college was shifted from its old building to the Morrison Extension (named after Mr. Cameran Morrison, tutor of the Maharaja) in which it is housed today.  The college celebrated its centenary from 10 to 12 January 2001.

Notability 
Conferment of Autonomy to this second oldest college of the state fulfills the long cherished demand of the students and the public of the region. Autonomy to the college aims at imparting quality education, framing need based curriculum in conformity with those prescribed by the Berhampur University and evolve its own methods of admission, evaluation and conduct of examinations. It endeavors to make the students aware of the relevance of theoretical knowledge to the practical demand of the changing world. The students’ performance will be evaluated both internally and externally. The college now, has its own Boards of Studies in all subjects and an Academic Council to guide and achieve the aims and objectives of Autonomy.

This College has also attained the distinction of being one of the first Lead Colleges of Orissa in 1990. This institute enjoys the reputation of being the second oldest college of the state. The college has been assessed by the National Assessment and Accreditation Council (NAAC) of India in September 2004 and has been accredited with B Grade

Notable alumni 
The alumni of the college occupied and continue to occupy the halo of position of distinction and pride in public life. Maharaja still pervades the atmosphere of the college and his noble spirit guides and inspires the students to achieve greater glory.

Hostel 
The college hostels provide accommodation for 240 boarders. The S.K.C.G. Boy's Hostel and the P.M.N. Hostel have a capacity of 110 and 50 boarders respectively.

Departments 
The college has a sanctioned strength of 2016 students and 83 teachers. It has affiliation in almost all major disciplines in the faculties.of Arts, Science and Commerce. From the session 1996-97 P.G. courses in Mathematics has been added to the already existing post graduate teaching facilities in Economics, Chemistry, Oriya, Commerce and Life Science, Besides teaching facilities for Honours courses in Mathematics, Physics, Chemistry Botany, Zoology, Computer application, English, Oriya, Sanskrit, Geography, History, Political Science, & Economics the college also offers teaching in subjects like Telugu, Hindi, Logic, Philosophy and Home Science. The Indira Gandhi National Open University has opened a centre in this college.

The Govt. of Orissa vide notification No.26413/HE dt.18-5-2001 have decided to restructure the Govt. College in the state. As a result, from the academic session of 2001–02, the +2 classes are functioning under the S.K.C.G Junior College.

Infrastructure 
 The college is known for its infrastructure with 42 classrooms, 8 galleries and 3 halls. 
 The laboratories are well equipped and adequate for the students. 
 It has also a sprawling play ground of 22,317 m2, catering to both indoor and outdoor games and sports requirements  of the students. 
 The college campus is large and studded with different buildings for Science, Commerce and Arts. 
 A Library Block with an Auditorium in the first floor was built in 1964–65. 
 Extension of the main building, a two storeyed block for the Humanities, an open-air stage, Geography Department,  a cycle stand, a canteen, an animal house and a workshop and acquisition of the Mission Bungalow, a spacious one and adjacent to the     college, have enlarged the college campus.

References 

Autonomous Colleges of Odisha
Gajapati district
Educational institutions established in 1896
1896 establishments in British India
British colonial architecture in India
Academic institutions formerly affiliated with the University of Madras